Kirron Anupam Kher (also Kiran or, Kiron born 14 June 1952) is an Indian politician; theatre, film and television actress; television personality; singer; entertainment producer; and a member of the Bharatiya Janata Party. In May 2014, she was elected to the Lok Sabha, the lower house of Indian Parliament, from Chandigarh.

Early life
Kiran Thakar Singh Sandhu was born on 14 June 1952 in Bangalore, Mysore State, India into a Punjabi Jatt Sikh family of the Sandhu clan and grew up in Chandigarh. During the period of her first marriage to Gautam Berry, she was known as 'Kiran Berry.' When she married Anupam Kher, she resumed her maiden name and also added her latest husband's surname, being known as 'Kiran Thakar Singh Kher.' In later life, she developed a firm belief in Numerology, and in 2003 (aged 51), she changed her name from "Kiran" to "Kirron" based on numerological calculations, dropped her maiden names, and came to be known as 'Kirron Kher.'

Kirron has one brother and two sisters. Her brother, the artist Amardeep Singh Sandhu, died in 2003. One of her sisters is the Arjuna award–winning badminton player, Kanwal Thakar Kaur. Her other sister, Sharanjit Kaur Sandhu, is the wife of a retired senior officer of the Indian Navy.

Kirron went to school in Jabalpur, Madhya Pradesh, and completed her school education in Chandigarh, and then graduated from the Department of Indian Theatre of Panjab University, Chandigarh.

Personal life
Kirron married Gautam Berry, a Mumbai–based businessman, in first week of March 1979, and had a son, Sikandar Kher.

In Mumbai, Kiran tried throughout the 1980s to get a foothold in the film industry, but without success. While visiting producer after producer seeking a role in films, Kirron renewed her acquaintance with Anupam Kher, who was also a similarly struggling actor, and whom she had known slightly at university in Chandigarh. Moving in the same theatre circles, they worked together in a play called Chandpuri Ki Champabai. In 1985, after Anupam had secured a break in films with Saaransh, Kirron divorced her first husband.

Career 
Kirron Kher made her film debut in 1983 in the Punjabi feature film Aasra Pyar Da, After this, she took a hiatus from films until 1996. Between 1983 and 1996, she appeared in one film, Pestonjee (1987), in which she acted in a small role alongside her second husband Anupam Kher.

Her return to acting came in the mid–1990s, through theatre, with the play Saalgirah written by playwright Javed Siddiqui and directed by Feroz Abbas Khan. She then hosted three television shows, starting with the short–lived Purushkshetra on Zee TV which got attention for bringing out the discussion of alternative sexuality for the first time, while also highlighting women's issues. Kiron Kher Today and Jagte Raho with Kiron Kher, before doing Hindi films.

Her comeback film was by Shyam Benegal, Sardari Begum (1996), which won her the Special Jury Award at the 1997 National Film Awards.

She then appeared in film director Rituparno Ghosh's Bengali film Bariwali (1999), to critical acclaim. When she won the National Film Award for Best Actress for the film, a controversy arose as a Bangla film actress, Rita Koiral, claimed that she had dubbed for the character of Kirron, making her an equal claimant to the award. Kirron refuted the charges claiming she spent hours rehearsing for her dialogue delivery, and the award was eventually not shared.

In 2002, Kirron appeared in Devdas (2002), alongside Shahrukh Khan, Madhuri Dixit and Aishwarya Rai, and was nominated for the Filmfare Best Supporting Actress Award.

In Khamosh Pani (Silent Waters) (2003), a film that portrays the plight of a woman abducted during partition of India, her character not only refused to kill herself as suggested by her family, but marries her abductor and, after his death, makes an earning teaching Quran to local children. It shows how her life changes dramatically when her son takes up Islamic extremism in 1979 during the rule of Zia–ul–Haq and his process of Islamization of Pakistan. She won the Best Actress Award, at Locarno International Film Festival, Switzerland, the Karachi International Film Festival, Karachi, and International Festivals at Ciepie in Argentina, and Cape Town in South Africa while the film won the Best Film – Golden Leopard, Festival Grand Prize at Locarno.

The Indian Film Festival of Los Angeles (IFFLA) 2004 paid tribute to Kirron during its annual festival.

In October 2004 Kirron made a guest appearance, along with her husband, in the American TV series ER playing Parminder Nagra's mother, Mrs. Rasgotra, in episode "Damaged." 

In 2005, she played the role of Sunanda in the tele–serial Prratima on Sahara One channel, before which she had appeared in TV series like Dil Na Jaane Kyon (Zee TV), Isi Bahane, and Chausath Panne.

Despite playing mostly supporting roles, her successful movies include Main Hoon Na (2004), Hum Tum (2004), Veer–Zaara (2004), and Mangal Pandey: The Rising (2005), where her performance drew rave reviews. Her work in Rang De Basanti (2006) was a huge hit and her performance got her second nomination for the Filmfare Best Supporting Actress Award. Her role in Fanaa (2006) and Kabhi Alvida Naa Kehna (2006) also received appreciation. Adding to her list of comical roles in 2008 she appeared in Singh Is Kinng, Saas bahu aur Sensex and Dostana. In 2009, she appeared as judge on India's Got Talent, the Indian franchise of the Got Talent series.

Socio–political activism 
Kirron Kher has been involved with non–profit movements such as Laadli (a campaign against female infanticide) and Roko Cancer (a campaign for awareness of cancer). She joined the Bhartiya Janata Party in 2009. She campaigned for the party in across the country during the elections, including in Chandigarh for the 2011 municipal corporation elections.
She has been a vocal admirer of BJP's Prime Ministerial candidate Narendra Modi since long before his candidature was announced. Bharatiya Janata Party(BJP) declared her as the Lok Sabha candidate from Chandigarh for General Elections, 2014. Subsequently, in May 2014, she won the seat with 1,91,362 votes, defeating sitting MP, Congress leader Pawan Bansal who received 1,21,720 votes, while AAP's Gul Panag came in third position with 1,08,679 votes.

As a Member of parliament from Chandigarh and having connection with the film industry, Kirron promised a film city for Chandigarh. After winning the seat, she said that she had difficulty in acquiring land in Chandigarh. However, her proposal was accepted by the Chandigarh Administration and the film city is proposed to be set up in Sarangpur, Chandigarh.

Kirron Kher, BJP candidate, won in 2019 Indian general election Chandigarh constituency by a margin of 46,970 votes.

Controversy 
After a woman was gang raped by an auto rickshaw driver and his accomplices in Chandigarh in 2017, she suggested that women should avoid traveling with strangers, earning widespread criticism from the opposition and social media.

Filmography

Television

Awards 

 1996: National Film Award – Special Jury Award: Sardari Begum
 1999: National Film Award for Best Actress: Bariwali
 2003: IIFA Award for Best Supporting Actress: Devdas
 2003: Locarno International Film Festival: Best Actress: Khamosh Pani (Silent Waters) 
2003: 5th Lux Style Awards: Best Film Actress: Khamosh Pani
 2003: Karachi International Film Festival: Best Female Actor in a Leading Role: Khamosh Pani (Silent Waters)
 2006: Screen Award for Best Supporting Actress: Rang De Basanti
 2010: Apsara Award for Best Actress in a Supporting Role: Kurbaan
 2015: PTC Punjabi Film Awards: Best Actress (Critics): Punjab 1984

References

External links

 

1955 births
Living people
Actresses from Chandigarh
Indian film actresses
Actresses in Hindi cinema
Actresses in Punjabi cinema
Actresses in Malayalam cinema
Actresses in Bengali cinema
Actresses in Urdu cinema
Indian stage actresses
Indian television actresses
Indian television talk show hosts
Actresses in Hindi television
Indian expatriate actresses in Pakistan
Filmfare Awards winners
Screen Awards winners
Punjabi people
Panjab University alumni
Bharatiya Janata Party politicians from Chandigarh
Best Actress National Film Award winners
Chandigarh politicians
Women in Chandigarh politics
Indian Sikhs
India MPs 2014–2019
Lok Sabha members from Chandigarh
Indian actor-politicians
21st-century Indian women politicians
21st-century Indian politicians
Special Jury Award (feature film) National Film Award winners
International Indian Film Academy Awards winners
Lux Style Award winners
India MPs 2019–present
National Democratic Alliance candidates in the 2019 Indian general election
Women members of the Lok Sabha